Aleksandr Borisov (born August 17, 1974, Kunya, Pskov Oblast) is a Russian political figure, deputy of the 8th State Duma. After graduating in 1997 from the Northwestern Management Institute, Borisov started working as a lawyer in one of the companies in Saint Peterburg. Later he continued working at the various factories, including "Mekhanichesky Zavod" and "Leninez".

His political career started in 2005 when he was appointed the head of the Central Staff of the All-Russian Public Organization Young Guard of United Russia. From 2009 to 2017, he was a member of the Federation Council, and in 2013, he was appointed Deputy Chairman of the committee on social policy. From 2017 to 2021, he headed the Central Executive Committee of the United Russia. Since September 2021, he has served as a deputy of the 8th State Duma.

On 24 March 2022, the United States Treasury sanctioned him in response to the 2022 Russian invasion of Ukraine.

References

1974 births
Living people
United Russia politicians
21st-century Russian politicians
Eighth convocation members of the State Duma (Russian Federation)
Russian individuals subject to the U.S. Department of the Treasury sanctions
Members of the Federation Council of Russia (after 2000)